Koh Wai, also known as Poulo Wai or the Wai Islands, is a group of two small wooded and uninhabited islands in the Gulf of Siam. The islands are located far away from the shore,   to the southwest of the coast of Preah Sihanouk Province, Cambodia. Administratively Koh Wai falls under Kampot Province. The Khmer word Koh (កោះ), means 'island' translated into English. Poulo Wai is of Malayan origin.

History
These islands were part of the basis of overlapping territorial claims between Cambodia, Thailand and Vietnam; the three nations used differing methods of measuring the extent of their territorial waters from the islands.

In May 1975, the area around these islands and nearby Koh Tang was the site of the Mayaguez incident, the last combat action of the Vietnam War, which involved the rescue of the SS Mayaguez.
One month later, Vietnam People's Army forces seized the islands and there was a battle between Khmer Rouge and Vietnamese troops over the control of the islands. Finally, the Vietnamese evacuated Koh Wai in August.

The Koh Wai islands were for a long time off-limits to tourists, but now they can be visited in organized excursions. Since the trip is too long to go and come back in the same day, visitors usually stay overnight on one of the islands.

See also
 Koh Rong Sanloem
 Koh Sdach
 List of islands of Cambodia
 List of Cambodian inland islands
 Sihanoukville

References

External links

 Concern over Boundary Affairs
 Grand Tour for Keen Divers - Poulo Wai
Cambodia's Islands

Sihanoukville (city)
Populated places in Sihanoukville province
Islands of Cambodia
Islands of the Gulf of Thailand